Lebohang Morake (born 11 July 1964), known as  Lebo M, is a South African producer and composer, known for his songwriting and vocal work on the soundtracks to films such as The Lion King, The Power of One and Outbreak and numerous stage productions. He was recommended to Disney by Hans Zimmer, the composer of both adaptations of The Lion King, and formed and conducted the African choir that sang for the films.

Early life 
Lebohang Morake was born on 11 July 1964 in Soweto, Johannesburg, South Africa. With no formal training in music, he left school at the age of nine to perform music in night clubs. Morake recorded his first single, "Celebration", when he was 13 years old, receiving only $20 for recording the record. When he was 13 years old, Morake became the youngest performer to sing at the nightclub Club Pelican, when he filled in for a backup singer who could not attend.

Career

Early career 
In 1979, Morake sought to broaden his horizons, so he left by bus for Maseru, Lesotho after hearing that a new club was going to be opening there. In Maseru, due to the apartheid system, he was under exile. At 15, he was working as a singer in the Victoria Hotel in Lesotho when Lesotho's Ambassador to the United States Tim Thahane noticed him and appreciated his musical abilities. Thahane helped Morake apply to the Duke Ellington School of the Arts, coordinating with the TransAfrica organization to send the singer to the United States. Morake lived at first in New York, again playing in restaurants and bars, and was supported by Black churches to attend music school. Morake moved to Los Angeles when he was 18 to pursue a music career.

Start in Hollywood 
In Los Angeles, he struggled to make ends meet, working odd jobs to survive while studying at Los Angeles City College. He performed sometimes at Memory Lane, a nightclub owned by Marla Gibbs. Morake was asked to help find a choir for the Oscars, so that they could perform music from 1987's Cry Freedom, a film about South Africa that was nominated for multiple Academy Awards, including one for Best Original Song. He made further strides in his music career when by chance, he ran into childhood friend Solly Letwaba, who was the bassist for Johnny Clegg. Letwaba introduced Morake to Clegg's producer, Hilton Rosenthal, who employed Morake as an intern and gofer for his production studio. Rosenthal was the music supervisor on the film The Power of One, and through him, Morake met the film's composer, Hans Zimmer. After being asked about some ideas for the film's soundtrack, Morake ended up co-writing and co-producing the music for The Power of One with Zimmer, helping to arrange the choruses. Morake used his knowledge of African rhythms to compose the soundtracks to other films, such as Congo (1995), Outbreak (1995), and Born to be Wild (1995). He decided to return to South Africa in the early 1990s, after the end of apartheid.

The Lion King 
Morake wrote and sang the opening Zulu chant at the beginning of Disney's The Lion King, for which he was sought by Zimmer. He also contributed to the sequel to the film's soundtrack, Rhythm of the Pride Lands, and the film's direct-to-video sequel The Lion King II: Simba's Pride.

The duo composed so much music that Disney approved of an additional soundtrack album, Rhythm of the Pride Lands, containing extra compositions. The Lion King's original soundtrack, with the compositions that had made the cut for the theatrical release, earned the two composers a Grammy Award, and Zimmer won an Academy Award for Best Original Score. Morake also helped score The Lion King's stage musical, creating new music and adding pieces from Rhythm of the Pride Lands. The musical was nominated for Best Original Score at the 52nd Tony Awards in 1998.

He founded the Lebo M Foundation and Till Dawn Entertainment.

On 23 July 2019, Morake performed 'Circle of Life' and 'He Lives in You' at the opening ceremony of the 24th World Scout Jamboree.

Personal life 
Morake was married to Viveca Gipson for 5 years. He divorced her and married Nandi Ndlovu and they were together for 11 years. He then divorced Ndlovu and married Angela Ngani-Casara for five years, from 2008 to 2013. Morake became engaged to Zoe Mthiyane but their relationship ended in 2016. He remarried his third wife, Angela, but they divorced again in 2017. He lives with his family in Johannesburg and Los Angeles.
His daughter Refi is also a singer who often performs by his side.
April 2021 Lebo got engaged to current partner Pretty Samuels.

Filmography 
Lebo Morake has composed, arranged, performed and produced music for the following films:
 The Lion King (soundtrack)
 The Lion King II: Simba's Pride
 The Lion King 1½
 The Lion King (musical) - singer at One by One
 The Power of One
 Dinosaur
 Disney's Animal Kingdom: The First Adventure
 Tears of the Sun
 Back on the Block
 Atlantis: The Lost Empire
 Listen Up: The Life of Quincy Jones
 Outbreak
 Congo
 Born to Be Wild
 Long Night's Journey Into Day
 The Lion King (2019 remake)
 The Woman King (2022)

Discography 
 How Wonderful We Are (1995)
 Rhythm of the Pride Lands (1995)
 Lebo M: Deeper Meaning (1997)
 Return to Pride Rock (1998)
 Lebo M Presents: Open Summahhh Open Happiness (2009)

References

External links 
 Official site
 Portrait of Lebo M., Mail & Guardian Online 12 Jul 2019
 Biography at Walt Disney Records
 
 
 
 https://zalebs.com/whats-hot/lion-kings-lebo-m-gets-married-sixth-time

1964 births
Grammy Award winners
Living people
People from Soweto
South African composers
South African male composers
20th-century South African male singers
21st-century South African male singers